The 2021–22 season was the 123rd season in the existence of SV Werder Bremen and the club's first season in the second division of German football since 1980–81. In addition to the domestic league, Werder Bremen participated in this season's edition of the DFB-Pokal.

Players

First-team squad

Players out on loan

Transfers

In

Out

Pre-season and friendlies

Competitions

Overall record

2. Bundesliga

League table

Results summary

Results by round

Matches
The league fixtures were announced on 25 June 2021.

DFB-Pokal

Statistics

Appearances and goals

Goalscorers

References

SV Werder Bremen seasons
Werder Bremen